Pastor Alan Campbell (7 August 1949 – 11 June 2017) was a Northern Irish Pentecostal pastor and founder of the Restored Open Bible Ministries in Belfast, Northern Ireland. 
Campbell served as the pastor and director of Restored Open Bible Ministries, a scholar and lecturer in the British Israelism movement and an advocate of white supremacy.

Campbell was notable in Historicist circles due to his Reformed theology in which he referred to the Papacy as the Antichrist of Biblical prophecy. Campbell's theology and racial views were often criticised by mainline-Protestant churches and ministers and he remained a controversial and outspoken figure until his death.

Brief biography
Alan Campbell was born in Belfast on 7 August 1949 into a staunchly Presbyterian home, in a Roman Catholic area.  His grandmother was a very firm adherent of the doctrine of British Israelism, and thus he was exposed to this teaching from a very early age.  Despite his upbringing, however, he did not convert to Christianity until 19 September 1965, in the Ravenhill Free Presbyterian Church after listening to a sermon by Ian Paisley.

Because of his "Kingdom Identity" views (which hold that Israel, not the church, is the bride of Christ, in contradiction to the teachings of the Westminster Confession of Faith) and his acceptance of Pentecostal beliefs, Campbell left the Free Presbyterian Church of Ulster and no longer promoted Ian Paisley and his literature.

Campbell began preaching in May 1974, and preached his first sermon on Bible prophecy on 24 September 1978. He was officially ordained to the ministry by Dr Francis Thomas on 18 July 1988. He graduated from the University of London with a bachelor's degree in history, and from the Queen's University of Belfast with a Certificate in Biblical Studies. He held the post of head of religious studies at Newtownabbey Community High School near Belfast where he was subject to at least one Ministry of Education inspection because of concerns about his teaching methods.  He held fiercely anti-Catholic views (referring to Catholics as worshipping a "wafer God") and used his website to disseminate these sentiments.  He was the author of a number of Bible study books, and lectured throughout the United Kingdom, the United States, Canada, and Australia although his ministry centred in Ulster, and many of his messages dealt with the political situation there. Campbell had contact with the Christian Assemblies International.

Campbell opposed miscegenation. In a lecture in the US, he stated that the white race is superior and that black people are the "beasts of the field" referred to in the Bible.
He supported apartheid in South Africa, was critical of Unionist politicians meeting Nelson Mandela and called Desmond Tutu a 'little black man'.

Church closure
The Sunday Life reported in December 2013, that Campbell's church had closed. Speaking to Sunday Life about the closure, Campbell said he had been seriously ill earlier that year.

References

External links
British-Israel: Fact or Fiction? by Pastor Alan Campbell
Film footage of Alan Campbell preaching at the Open-Bible Ministries Kingdom Truth conference in 2012

1949 births
2017 deaths
Clergy from Belfast
Alumni of the University of London
King James Only movement
Pentecostal pastors
Pentecostal writers
Christian clergy from Northern Ireland